Franklin Pele (born 18 December 2000) is a New Zealand professional rugby league footballer who plays as a  for the Canterbury Bankstown Bulldogs in the National Rugby League

He previously played for the Cronulla-Sutherland Sharks in the NRL.

Background
Pele was born in Auckland, New Zealand, and is of Western Samoan and America Samoan descent. When Franklin was the age of seven, his family moved from South Auckland to settle in Sydney, Australia. 

He played junior rugby league for the Otahuhu Leopards in Auckland, and St Patrick's Sutherland and the Gymea Gorillas in Sydney.

He attended Endeavour Sports High School and played for the Australian Schoolboys in 2018.

Playing career
In round 12 of the 2021 NRL season, Pele made his debut for Cronulla-Sutherland against the Gold Coast. He was later sidelined for 9-12 weeks after undergoing surgery for an injury sustained in a reserve grade game, effectively ending his debut season.

Statistics

NRL
 Statistics are correct as of the end of the 2022 season

References

External links
Cronulla Sharks profile

2000 births
Living people
Cronulla-Sutherland Sharks players
Canterbury-Bankstown Bulldogs players
New Zealand rugby league players
New Zealand emigrants to Australia
New Zealand people of American Samoan descent
New Zealand sportspeople of Samoan descent
Rugby league players from Auckland
Rugby league props